...To Be Continued is the fourth studio album by American soul musician Isaac Hayes, issued in 1970 on Stax Records' Enterprise label. The LP includes Hayes' cover of the Burt Bacharach/Hal David composition "The Look of Love", which was issued as a single in an edited form, peaking at #79 on the Billboard Hot 100. Hayes had covered Bacharach/David songs on his previous albums Hot Buttered Soul ("Walk On By") and The Isaac Hayes Movement ("I Just Don't Know What to Do With Myself").

The ...To Be Continued album as a whole peaked at #1 on the Billboard Black Albums and Jazz Albums charts, and at #11 on the Billboard 200.

Track listing

Personnel

See also
List of number-one R&B albums of 1970 (U.S.)
List of number-one R&B albums of 1971 (U.S.)

References

1970 albums
Isaac Hayes albums
Stax Records albums
Albums produced by Isaac Hayes
Jazz albums by American artists
Albums with cover art by Joel Brodsky